Coprinopsis nivea is a species of mushroom producing fungus in the family Psathyrellaceae. It is commonly known as the snowy inkcap.

Taxonomy 
It was first described in 1801 by the German mycologist Christiaan Hendrik Persoon who classified it as Agaricus niveus.

In 1838 it was reclassified as Coprinus niveus by the Swedish mycologist Elias Magnus Fries.

In 2001 phylogentic analysis restructured the Coprinus genus and it was reclassified as Coprinopsis nivea by the mycologists Scott Alan Redhead, Rytas J. Vilgalys & Jean-Marc Moncalvo.

Description 
Coprinopsis nivea is a small inkcap mushroom which grows in wetland environments.

Cap: 1.5–3 cm. Starts egg shaped expanding to become campanulate (bell shaped). Covered in white powdery fragments of the veil when young. Gills: Start white before turning grey and ultimately black and deliquescing (dissolving into an ink-like black substance). Crowded and adnate or free. Stem: 3–9 cm long and 4-7mm in diameter. White with a very slightly bulbous base which may present with white tufts similar to that of the cap. Spore print: Black. Spores: Flattened ellipsoid and smooth with a germ pore. 15-19 x 8.5-10.5 μm. Taste: Indistinct. Smell: Indistinct.

Etymology 
The specific epithet nivea (originally niveus) is Latin for snowy or snow covered. This is a reference to the powdery white appearance of this mushroom.

Habitat and distribution 
Grows in small trooping or tufting groups on old dung, especially that of cows and horses, Summer through late Autumn. Widespread and recorded quite regularly.

Similar species 

 Coprinopsis pseudonivea.

References 

Psathyrellaceae
Coprinopsis